Bernhard Eilman (born 23 August 1892 Kronstadt – 14 January 1965) was an Estonian politician. 
He was a member of II Riigikogu.

References

1892 births
1965 deaths
People from Kronstadt
People from Petergofsky Uyezd
Estonian Independent Socialist Workers' Party politicians
Estonian Socialist Workers' Party politicians
Members of the Riigikogu, 1923–1926
Members of the Riigikogu, 1926–1929
Members of the Riigikogu, 1929–1932
Members of the Riigikogu, 1932–1934